Banki or Bānki State was a princely state in Odisha during the British Raj. Its capital was Banki, in the western part of present day Cuttack district.

The last Raja was arrested for murder and Banki State was subsequently annexed by the British Raj. Until 1840, it paid an annual tribute of £443.

History
Banki was a zamindari state of Orissa located in the hilly area to the west of Cuttack district. The predecessor state had been ruled by a powerful Raja who in the 17th century had established the zamindari of Dompada as a gift to his second son.

The river Mahanadi flowed to the north of the state, separating it from Baramba and Tigiria. It was bound in the south by Puri district and in the west by Khandpara State; a little part of the state was located north of the Mahanadi. The state included 177 villages, the most important of which were Charchika, Baideswar, Kalapathar and Subarnapur.

Banki became a British protectorate in 1807 following the defeat of the Maratha Empire in the area. In 1821 it was made part of the Feudatory States of Orissa.
The population grew from 49,426 inhabitants in 1872 to 56,900 in 1881, with a density of 377 per square mile in 1901. 99.5% of the population were Hindu and the main ethnic group in the hills were the Juang people.

Rulers
The rulers of Banki State bore the title 'Raja'. In 1840 the last Raja was deposed and the state was confiscated after he was condemned by a British tribunal to life in prison for murder. After annexation Banki was put under direct control of the Bengal Presidency, being administered by the Cuttack Commissioner.

See also
Doctrine of Lapse
Orissa Tributary States

References

External links
Odisha Royals - Puri Estate

History of Odisha
Cuttack district
Princely states of India
1807 establishments in India
1840 disestablishments in India

ca:Banki